Ashley Kumar (born 1986) is an English actor perhaps best known for portraying the recurring character Todd Taylor in popular British soap opera EastEnders. His father is an Indian Hindu and his mother is English.

Filmography
EastEnders - Todd Taylor (2009–2010)
Spooks - Ashok (2009)
The Bill - Zeppo Clarke (2009)
Doctors - Duncan Oliver (2009)
M.I. High - Student Hoodie (2009)
Benidorm - Jamie (2009)
Little Crackers - Young Omid Djalili (2012)
This Morning - Himself (2014)
The Level - Sharad Nayar (2016)
Doctors - Dino D'Angelis (2020)

Audiography
Doctor Who - Jared in "The Curse of Davros" (2012)

References

External links

Living people
1986 births
English male television actors